William Stanley Furr (22 July 1891 – 1975) was an English professional footballer who played as an outside right in the Football League for Leicester Fosse.

Personal life 
Furr's three brothers, George, Harry and Vic also played professional football. His sisters Amelia and Miriam married footballers William Grimes and George Payne respectively.

Career statistics

References

English footballers
Brentford F.C. players
English Football League players
Association football outside forwards
Southern Football League players
Hitchin Town F.C. players
Leicester City F.C. players
Footballers from the London Borough of Barnet
1891 births
Luton Town F.C. players
Letchworth F.C. players
1975 deaths

Eccles United F.C. players